Berit Kullander (born March 23, 1938) is a Norwegian actress, dancer, and singer.

Kullander performed in the Norwegian Opera Company's productions of the ballets Swan Lake and La Sylphide. After that she danced at Chat Noir from 1954 to 1965. At the Norwegian Theater from 1965 to 1967, her roles included Anita in West Side Story and the secretary in the stage adaptation of Franz Kafka's The Trial. For six seasons she was at the Swedish National Touring Theater (1967–1972), Intimate Theater, and Oscar Theater. She performed with the Norwegian National Traveling Theater from 1976 to 2005. In addition, she toured with Jens Book-Jenssen.

Filmography

 1956: Gylne ungdom as a dancer
 1962: Operasjon Løvsprett as Goggen's girlfriend
 1965: Klimaks
 1966: Kontorsjef Tangen (television) as the lady at the information desk
 1968: Festival i Venedig (television) as a starlet
 1971: Gråt elskede mann as Helen

References

External links
 
 Berit Kullander at the Swedish Film Database
 Berit Kullander at Filmfront
 Berit Kullander at Sceneweb

1938 births
Norwegian female dancers
20th-century Norwegian actresses
Actresses from Oslo
Living people